Howard Kevin Stern (born November 29, 1968) is an American attorney based in  California. He was the domestic partner, attorney and agent of the late model Anna Nicole Smith.  He became known as a co-star on Smith's 2002–2004 reality television series The Anna Nicole Show. He currently works  with  the Los Angeles Public Defender's Office.

Early life
Stern was born to a Jewish family and raised in Los Angeles. He graduated with a B.A. degree from the University of California, Berkeley, in 1990 and received his Juris Doctor (J.D.) degree from the University of California, Los Angeles. He was admitted to the State Bar of California on February 25, 1994.

Career and personal life
Stern's law firm first handled Anna Nicole Smith's modeling contracts in the mid-1990s. Stern met Anna Nicole Smith in 1998, after  the  death  of  her  husband J. Howard Marshall. When she fought for Marshall's fortune, Stern presented her direct examination at the trial. Stern's law firm was dissolved around the time he became a co-star on The Anna Nicole Show (2002 - 2004). Stern maintained an apartment in Santa Monica, California, from which he  operated a business called Hot Smoochie Lips, Inc., a talent agency that had Anna Nicole Smith as a client.

On September 10, 2006, Stern was with Smith when her son, Daniel Wayne Smith, died in Nassau, Bahamas, while visiting his mother and newborn half-sister Dannielynn. Bahamian Police and the Inquest declared Daniel's death as an accidental overdose on antidepressants and methadone. No foul play was involved. On  September 28, 2006, Stern and Smith exchanged wedding vows in a legally nonbinding ceremony in Nassau, Bahamas. The ceremony was officiated by a Baptist minister.

Smith died on February 8, 2007, less than five months after Daniel. According to the Florida court overseeing her estate, Smith left everything to Daniel in a 16-page will that named Stern as executor of the Estate.

On February 21, 2007, hearings commenced in Florida's Broward County Circuit Court over the disposition of Smith's remains. Denying motions by Smith's mother and Stern, judge  awarded custody of Smith's body to her infant daughter, Dannielynn Hope Marshall Stern via attorney whom judge  appointed the baby's guardian ad litem. Smith was buried next to Daniel in the Bahamas.

Paternity dispute

On September 26, 2006, Stern claimed in an interview with Larry King on CNN that he was Dannielynn's father; celebrity photographer Larry Birkhead also claimed that he was Dannielynn's father. The Bahamian birth certificate lists the daughter's name as Dannielynn Hope Marshall Stern with Howard K. Stern as the father.

On February 9, 2007, following Anna Nicole Smith's death, it was revealed that Stern had custody of Smith's child, Dannielynn. Frédéric Prinz von Anhalt, the husband of the actress Zsa Zsa Gabor alleged he could be the father of Smith's daughter and threatened to file a lawsuit for custody. On April 10, 2007, a Bahamian court determined from DNA evidence presented by court-appointed DNA expert that Larry Birkhead is the father of Dannielynn. Stern announced that he would not contest the ruling and would help Birkhead obtain sole custody.

Prosecution for conspiracy
On March 13, 2009, the California Attorney General and Los Angeles County District Attorney announced that they would be charging Stern, Dr. Sandeep Kapoor and Dr. Khristine Eroshevich of conspiring to "commit the crimes of prescribing, administering and dispensing controlled substances to an addict." They were not accused of causing Smith's death in 2007.

The trial began August 4, 2010, in Los Angeles. Stern, Dr. Eroshevich, and Dr. Sandeep Kapoor pleaded not guilty.
On October 28, 2010, Stern and Dr. Eroshevich were found guilty, but Kapoor was acquitted.

In  2011, judge Robert Perry dismissed Stern's conviction, indicating there was no evidence brought forth to prove Stern had intended to break the law by using assumed names to protect Smith's privacy. The single conviction which remained standing, a felony charge of fraud against Dr. Eroshevich, was reduced to a misdemeanor.<ref>"Anna Nicole's ex wins court victory". Belfast Telegraph; January 6, 2011.</ref>

In 2015, Perry dismissed the felony conviction against Stern for the second time. In his ruling, Perry exclaimed, "this case reeks of unfairness", adding he believed the prosecutors "seemed to have unfairly targeted Stern because he was a public figure" and noting that the trial  had already cost the taxpayers in an excess of $500,000. "Howard Stern simply has been through enough ... I find there is no reason to permit this case to go forward," Los Angeles Superior Court judge Robert J. Perry told reporters."Case dismissed for the 2nd time against Howard K. Stern", ETCanada.com, July 22, 2015.

Libel and defamation lawsuits
Powell  Goldstein  LLP was the law  firm  for Stern in the libel lawsuits against Rita Cosby; lawyer  John O'Quinn who represented  Smith's  mother  Virgie  Arthur "Stern sues Anna Nicole Smith's mother's lawyer", CNN. April 13, 2007. and a defamation  lawsuit filed by  Virgie  Arthur whose suit was dismissed before the trial in  2010 after  TMZ Productions,  CBS, Stern and other defendants  won summary judgments."Virgie Arthur Defamers? Those she sued fire back: Stern, CBS, KPRC-TV: All ask how can anyone defame Virgie, LOL? Lawsuits removed to federal court", ArtHarris.com, November 7, 2007. Lin Wood represented Stern as executor of Smith's Estate in federal action against developer G. Ben Thompson of South Carolina, his son-in-law Ford Shelley Jr., Susan M. Brown, Esq. for misappropriation and theft of estate property.

Journalist Rita Cosby alleged in her book, Blonde Ambition: The Untold Story Behind Anna Nicole Smith's Death'', released on September 4, 2007, that Smith's nannies revealed that a sex tape existed of Stern and former rival Larry Birkhead engaged in a homosexual relationship. However, a lawyer for the nannies threatened to file suit, claiming that the nannies never spoke about such an encounter between Stern and Birkhead. After Stern filed a $60-million libel suit against Cosby and her publisher in October 2007, a spokesperson for the nannies claimed Cosby had offered bribes in an unsuccessful attempt to contact the nannies.

In July 2009, in a court hearing on whether to dismiss the lawsuit, Stern's attorney claimed that in deposition of the suits, Cosby admitted there was no videotape and could not prove other allegations. Cosby replied to the Stern lawsuit by saying "...we are solid on our facts more than ever... we are sure of what we have." In Cosby's videotaped deposition given in a $60 million libel suit against her filed by Stern, Cosby said her sources for the gay sex tape were private investigators Don Clark of Houston and his associate, Wilma Vicedomine. They were hired by attorney John O'Quinn who represented Virgie Arthur. O'Quinn had used the same strategy before in corporate litigations, a death by a thousand cuts, L. Lin Wood  explained.

In August 2009, federal judge Denny Chin ruled that: 'Cosby's actions are extremely troubling, and suggest that she was attempting to obstruct justice by tampering with witnesses' and allowed most of Stern's US$60-million lawsuit against Cosby and her publisher, Hachette, to proceed. Three months later, the lawsuit was withdrawn as settled, but no information has been released on the terms of this out-of-court settlement.

References

External links

1968 births
Living people
Lawyers from Los Angeles
University of California, Berkeley alumni
UCLA School of Law alumni